TrackMania Turbo is a racing video game developed by Nadeo and published by Ubisoft. Announced at E3 2015, the title is the first TrackMania game released on consoles since 2009's TrackMania: Build to Race on the Wii. The game features support for virtual reality.  The game was originally set to be released on 3 November 2015, but was delayed to 22 March 2016 to give additional time to the development team to further polish the game.

Gameplay
TrackMania: Turbo features gameplay akin to that of previous games in the series. The player can race on over 200 different tracks across four different locations, namely Canyon Grand Drift, Valley Down and Dirty, Rollercoaster Lagoon and International Stadium. Similar to previous games, the game moves at a very high pace with a high focus on stunts. The game's developer stated that "[They] wanted [Trackmania Turbo] to be an arcade game"

Various modes appear in the game, including a single-player campaign and a mode called Double Driver, which is a cooperative multiplayer mode where two players control the same car. TrackMania Turbo also has a split screen multiplayer mode for up to 4 players which makes it the first racing game with such gameplay for the consoles PlayStation 4 and Xbox One and PC in 2016.

The track editor from previous games also returns, which allows players to create their own tracks and share them with other players. A new addition to the track editor is its ability to generate random tracks. A new feature introduced to the franchise is Systemic music. It ties the soundscape to the gameplay, dynamically intensifying, heightening or lessening the music to fit with the gameplay.

Reception

TrackMania Turbo received "generally favorable" reviews, according to video game review aggregator Metacritic.

References

External links
 

2016 video games
Multiplayer and single-player video games
Multiplayer online games
Video games with user-generated gameplay content
Video games using procedural generation
Oculus Rift games
PlayStation 4 games
Racing video games
Ubisoft games
Video games developed in France
Windows games
Xbox One games
Split-screen multiplayer games
PlayStation 4 Pro enhanced games
TrackMania